Dusty is an unincorporated community in Whitman County, Washington, United States. It lies at the junction of Washington State Route 26 and Washington State Route 127.

Geography

The community is located in the Palouse Region, which is known for its rolling hills and agricultural production. Various reports put the population of this tiny hamlet at either 11 or 12 people and 2 horses (+/- a horse).

Notable residents
Dusty is home of Wylie Gustafson, leader of the musical group Wylie & The Wild West. Coming from an extremely small community, this group has performed at the National Cowboy Poetry Gathering, The National Folk Festival, Kennedy Center, Lincoln Center, on A Prairie Home Companion, the National Lentil Festival and on the Grand Ole Opry.

References

Unincorporated communities in Washington (state)
Unincorporated communities in Whitman County, Washington